The following is a list of organizations with paleoconservative ideas. Paleoconservatism is a term for a conservative political philosophy found primarily in the United States stressing tradition, limited government, civil society, anti-colonialism and anti-federalism, along with religious, regional, national and Western identity.

American Party (modern)
American Family Association
American Ideas Institute
The American Conservative, a magazine of the American Ideas Institute
American Independent Party
American Nationalist Union
Chronicles (magazine)
The Conservative Caucus
Constitution Party
Council of Conservative Citizens
Family Research Council
Gun Owners of America
Intercollegiate Studies Institute
John Birch Society
John Randolph Club
Liberty Committee
National Association for Gun Rights
Rockford Institute
United States Business and Industry Council
VDARE
Young Conservatives of Texas
Youth for Western Civilization

References

 
Conservative organizations in the United States
Conservatism-related lists